Michael Howell Blakemore OBE, AO (born 18 June 1928) is an Australian actor, writer and theatre director who has also made a handful of films. A former Associate Director of the National Theatre, in 2000 he became the only individual to win Tony Awards for best Director of a Play and Musical in the same year for Copenhagen and Kiss Me, Kate.

Biography

Early life and career
Blakemore was born in Sydney, Australia, son of Conrad Howell Blakemore and his wife, Una Mary Litchfield. He married English actress Shirley Bush. Blakemore was educated at The King's School, Sydney, and went on to study medicine at the University of Sydney.

Blakemore's first job in the theatre was as press agent for Robert Morley during the Australian tour of Edward, My Son, who advised him to try drama school. In 1950 he came to London, enrolled at the Royal Academy of Dramatic Art and trained as an actor until 1952. He made his first professional stage appearance in 1952 at the Theatre Royal, Huddersfield, as the doctor in The Barretts of Wimpole Street.

He then worked for several years in repertory including Birmingham Repertory Company, Bristol and Coventry, and made his first London appearance at the Princes Theatre in March 1958 as Jack Poyntz in the musical play School.  He also played small parts at Stratford in the Shakespeare Memorial Theatre's 1959 season.  It was at the latter that he met and worked with Laurence Olivier and Peter Hall.

Turns to directing
He appeared in two seasons at the Open Air Theatre, Regent's Park, playing Sir Toby Belch in Twelfth Night and Holofernes in Love's Labour's Lost in 1962; Dogberry in Much Ado About Nothing and Theseus in A Midsummer Night's Dream in 1963. At the Comedy Theatre in December 1963 he played Badger in Toad of Toad Hall, then toured Australia as Palmer Anderson in A Severed Head. He joined the Glasgow Citizens 1966–67, where his parts included George in Who's Afraid of Virginia Woolf? and Maitland in Inadmissible Evidence. During this period and after acting for some 15 years, Blakemore decided that his true calling was in directing. For the Citizens' Theatre in Glasgow he directed The Investigation, Little Malcolm, Stephen D and Nightmare Abbey in 1966; and The Strange Case of Martin Richter, The Visions of Simone Machard, A Choice of Wars and Rosmersholm in 1967.  He became its Co-Artistic Director in 1968 and had a great success with Peter Nichols A Day in the Death of Joe Egg in 1967, accompanying the play on its moves to London that year and to Broadway in 1968, earning his first Tony nomination for directing.

National Theatre
In 1969, Blakemore joined the National Theatre at the Old Vic to direct The National Health by Peter Nichols. He later directed Laurence Olivier in Eugene O'Neill's Long Day's Journey into Night (1971). In 1970, as the National Theatre began a slow, and much delayed, transition from the Old Vic premises to the multi-stage South Bank site, Blakemore was invited by Laurence Olivier to become one of two Associate Directors. Since Olivier had already suffered from medical crises that were a feature of the last quarter of his life, the question of eventual succession as Artistic Director was obviously in the background. Blakemore felt he was a probable candidate, and indeed, according to Olivier's biographer Philip Ziegler, he was highly favoured.

However, in 1973 the Board of the National Theatre appointed Peter Hall without consulting Olivier. Blakemore wrote:

Blakemore and Hall had been rivals during the 1959 season at the Royal Shakespeare Company, when Hall had directed Blakemore as an actor and both had had romantic ideas about Vanessa Redgrave. Blakemore became one of ten associate directors forming what was called a planning committee. Blakemore and Hall's rivalry was dramatised when Blakemore presented a formal manifesto to the committee recommending reform. The committee refused to discuss the manifesto and Blakemore was eventually forced to resign when his salary was stopped without warning or explanation. His other productions included Tyger by Adrian Mitchell, co-directed with John Dexter (1971), The Front Page by Ben Hecht and Charles MacArthur (1972), Macbeth (1972), The Cherry Orchard (translated by Ronald Hingley, 1973), Grand Manoeuvres (1974), Engaged by W. S. Gilbert (1975), and Plunder by Ben Travers (1976).

Later career
In 1977, he joined the Royal Shakespeare Company to direct Peter Nichols' Privates on Parade. He became resident director of the Lyric Theatre, Hammersmith in 1980, where he directed Michael Frayn's Make and Break, opening on 12 March, starring Leonard Rossiter and Prunella Scales, and which in a revised version transferred on 24 April to the Theatre Royal Haymarket. This was followed in October 1980 by Ibsen's The Wild Duck in a new translation by Ronald Hingley; and in February 1982 by the world premiere of Frayn's Noises Off prior to its transfer to the Savoy Theatre.

His association with playwright Michael Frayn, which began at the Lyric Hammersmith with Make and Break (1980) and Noises Off (1982), continued with Frayn's Benefactors (Vaudeville, 1984), Frayn's translation of Uncle Vanya (Vaudeville, 1988), and his original plays, Here (Donmar Warehouse, 1993) and Now You Know (Hampstead, 1995). In 1980, Blakemore was invited to direct a series of four plays at the newly reconstructed Lyric Theatre (Hammersmith) by Artistic Director Bill Thomley. The Board made it known that they were looking for a new Artistic Director, and Blakemore decided to put his name forward. However, the job went to Peter James.

After an absence of many years, Blakemore returned to the National to direct Frayn's play Copenhagen in May 1998, prior to its transfer to the Duchess Theatre in February 1999. This was followed by Alarms and Excursions (Gielgud, September 1998), Democracy (National, Cottesloe, September 2003; Wyndham's, April 2004), and Afterlife (National, Lyttelton, June 2008).

In addition to his work in the subsidised theatre, Blakemore has directed many productions in the West End and on Broadway, including Noël Coward's Design for Living with Vanessa Redgrave (1973), David Hare's first play, Knuckle (1974), Peter Shaffer's Lettice and Lovage with Maggie Smith and Margaret Tyzack (1987), the musical City of Angels by Larry Gelbart, Cy Coleman and David Zippel (1989) and Arthur Miller's The Ride Down Mt. Morgan (1991).

In 1995, he directed the off-Broadway production of Death Defying Acts, composed of three one-act plays (Central Park West by Woody Allen, The Interview by David Mamet and Hotline by Elaine May). Also Coleman's The Life (1997), the revival of Kiss Me, Kate (1999), Embers by Christopher Hampton, with Jeremy Irons at the Duke of York's Theatre in London (March 2006)  and, on Broadway, Deuce by Terrence McNally (April 2007) starring Angela Lansbury and Marian Seldes . Blakemore's production of Is He Dead?, a comic play by Mark Twain, never previously produced, opened on Broadway in November 2007 with a run of 105 performances . In 2014 Blakemore directed Angela Lansbury once more, in the critically acclaimed West End production of "Blithe Spirit". His most recent production was the London revival of 'The Life', staged at the Southwark Playhouse in 2017, starring Sharon D Clarke.

Film
Blakemore directed and scripted the documentary, A Personal History of the Australian Surf: The Confessions of a Straight Poofter (1981), in which he appeared as himself. Tom Milne, reviewing it for the Time Out Film Guide, described the film as, "basically a home movie in which theatre director Blakemore traces his graduation from Bondi Beach to National Theatre." He followed with the film version of Privates on Parade (1982) featuring Denis Quilley and John Cleese. In 1994, Blakemore wrote and directed Country Life. In this adaptation of Chekhov's Uncle Vanya, transferred to an Australian setting, he also played the role of Alexander who has left the London literary scene to return to his roots. The film received five nominations from the Australian Film Institute and was entered into the 19th Moscow International Film Festival.

Filmography

Film

Television

Awards and nominations
Awards
 1967 Evening Standard Award Best Play – A Day in the Death of Joe Egg
 1971 Variety Magazine London Drama Critics Best Director – Forget-Me-Not Lane
 1972 Plays and Players Award for Best Director – Long Day's Journey into Night
 1972 Plays and Players Award for Best Director – The Front Page
 2000 Drama Desk Award Outstanding Director of a Play – Copenhagen
 2000 Tony Award for Best Direction of a Play – Copenhagen
 2000 Drama Desk Award Outstanding Director of a Musical – Kiss Me, Kate
 2000 Tony Award for Best Direction of a Musical – Kiss Me, Kate
 2003 Helpmann Award for Best Direction of a Play – Copenhagen
 2010 Inducted into the American Theater Hall of Fame.

Nominations
 1968 Tony Award for Best Direction of a Play – A Day in the Death of Joe Egg
 1984 Tony Award for Best Direction of a Play – Noises Off
 1984 Drama Desk Award Outstanding Director of a Play – Noises Off
 1990 Tony Award for Best Direction of a Play – Lettice and Lovage
 1990 Tony Award for Best Direction of a Musical – City of Angels
 1990 Drama Desk Award Outstanding Director of a Musical – City of Angels
 1997 Tony Award for Best Direction of a Musical – The Life
 1997 Drama Desk Award Outstanding Direction of a Musical – The Life
 2002 Laurence Olivier Award Best Director – Kiss Me, Kate
 2003 London Evening Standard Sydney Edwards Award – Democracy
 2005 Helpmann Award for Best Direction of a Play – Democracy

Bibliography

References

External links

1928 births
Alumni of RADA
Australian expatriates in the United Kingdom
Australian male stage actors
Australian theatre directors
Drama Desk Award winners
English film directors
English theatre directors
Helpmann Award winners
Living people
Male actors from Sydney
People educated at The King's School, Parramatta
Tony Award winners
Officers of the Order of Australia